Orpheo McCord (born 1979) is an American composer and percussionist. He is an original member of Edward Sharpe and the Magnetic Zeros, and a former member of The Fall, Fool's Gold and Cass McCombs. His debut solo album, Recovery Inhale, was released on January 26, 2018.

Early life and education
McCord attended Berklee College of Music, graduating in 2002. He has spent time in Ghana studying African percussion, and has also studied percussion in Mali, Cuba and Morocco.

His father Joseph McCord has said he was named after the musician Orpheus from Greek mythology. Joseph McCord was a professional mime who went by the name Merlin, and was one of Ken Kesey's Merry Pranksters.

Career

The Fall (2006-07)
In May 2006 after several members of U.K. Band The Fall quit mid-tour, McCord was recruited by frontman Mark E. Smith to join The Fall along with guitarist Tim Presley and bassist Rob Barbato. McCord toured the US and Europe with the band, and was a member of The Fall for their 26th album Reformation Post TLC (2007), as well as the live album Last Night at The Palais, recorded in 2007 and released two years later. The 2006-07 lineup was a pleasant one for The Fall, absent the infighting that marked most of the band's numerous incarnations. In his 2008 autobiography Renegade, Smith called McCord the best of the more than a dozen drummers The Fall had up to that point, with an openness to new ideas and straightforward playing that avoided cliches.

Edward Sharpe and the Magnetic Zeros (2007-present)
Edward Sharpe and the Magnetic Zeros were formed in Los Angeles in 2007 by frontman Alex Ebert. McCord met Ebert at a mutual friend's party and then again while jogging in Elysian Park, where Ebert asked him to join the band. They released their debut album Up From Below in 2009, followed by Here in 2012, a self-titled album in 2013, and PersonA in 2016. The group won the Grammy Award for Best Music Film in 2013 for the documentary Big Easy Express. McCord incorporates African influences in his work with the band, using a hybridization of drum set, marimba, conga, djembe and electronic percussion.

McCord played marimba on Alex Ebert's score for the 2013 film All Is Lost, which won the Golden Globe Award for Best Original Score.

Solo work
On January 26, 2018, McCord's debut solo album, Recovery Inhale, was released on Sound Creature Records. The album is composed of "hypnotic instrumental pieces... treading the line between new age and minimalist ambient music." "Ghost Ship", the first single, was released in December 2017. On the album, McCord performs all instruments, predominantly effected marimba and kalimba.

Other work
McCord was a member of Cass McCombs' band starting in 2007 and has played on four of his albums. He was formerly the drummer and percussion leader in Fool's Gold, an LA pop band whose music incorporates African rhythms. In 2010, he played with Harper Simon as a duo at the Festival au Désert in Mali, outside of Timbuktu. They also performed there with the Tuareg band Tinariwen. In 2014, McCord and Mikael Jorgensen (pianist/keyboardist for Wilco) formed the duo Prism Break, inspired by early 1970s German experimental rock. McCord has also performed with Ima Robot, The Flaming Lips, Jack Johnson, Dawes and He's My Brother She's My Sister.

Personal life
McCord is based in Ojai, California, where he lives with his wife Rachel Kolar (of He's My Brother She's My Sister) and their two children.

Discography

Albums

Appears on

Soundtracks and compilations

References

External links
 Official website
 

Living people
1979 births
American male drummers
American rock drummers
American rock percussionists
American marimbists
American male composers
Conga players
Djembe players
21st-century American drummers
Indie rock drummers
The Fall (band) members
Berklee College of Music alumni
Musicians from California
Musicians from Victoria, British Columbia
People from Ojai, California
20th-century American drummers
Edward Sharpe and the Magnetic Zeros members